Folketing elections were held in Denmark on 11 April 1924. The result was a victory for the Social Democratic Party led by Thorvald Stauning, which won 55 of the 149 seats. Voter turnout was 78.6% in Denmark proper. In the Faroe Islands constituency there was only one candidate, who was returned unopposed.

Results

References

Elections in Denmark
Denmark
Folketing
Denmark